Getting Even may refer to:

 Getting Even (album), by Greg Ginn
 Getting Even (1909 film), an American film
 Getting Even (1986 film), an American film
 Getting Even (Bi hesab), a 2017 Iranian film with Getting Even (1986 film)
 "Getting Even" (short story), by Isaac Asimov
 Getting Even (Allen book), a collection of humorous stories by Woody Allen
 Seeking revenge